A clan is a group of people united by actual or perceived kinship
and descent. Even if lineage details are unknown, clans may claim descent from founding member or apical ancestor. Clans, in indigenous societies, tend to be endogamous, meaning that their members can marry one another. Clans preceded more centralized forms of community organization and government, and exist in every country. Kinship-based groups may also have a symbolic ancestor, whereby the clan shares a "stipulated" common ancestor who serves as a symbol of the clan's unity.

Etymology 
The English word "clan" is derived from old Irish  meaning "children", "offspring", "progeny" or "descendants"; it is not from the word for "family" or "clan" in either Irish or Scottish Gaelic. According to the Oxford English Dictionary, the word "clan" was introduced into English in around 1425, as a descriptive label for the organization of society in Ireland and the Scottish Highlands.

None of the Irish and Scottish Gaelic terms for kinship groups is cognate to English clan; Scottish Gaelic  means "descendants":
   means (English) "clan"
  means "family" in the sense of the nuclear family, or can include more distant relatives living in the same house
  means either "family" in the sense of "household", or everyone who lives in the house, including non-relatives
  means "family" in the broad sense of "kinsfolk"

Clans as political units 
In different cultures and situations, a clan usually has different meaning than other kin-based groups, such as tribes and bands. Often, the distinguishing factor is that a clan is a smaller, integral part of a larger society such as a tribe, chiefdom, or a state. In some societies, clans may have an official leader such as a chief, matriarch or patriarch; or such leadership role is performed by elders. In others, leadership positions may have to be achieved.

Examples include Irish, Scottish, Chinese, Korean, and Japanese clans, which exist as distinct social groupings within their respective nations. Note, however, that tribes and bands can also be components of larger societies. The Biblical tribes of Israel were composed of many clans. Arab clans are sub-tribal groups within Arab society. Native American and First Nations peoples, often referred to as "tribes", also have clans. For instance, Ojibwa bands are smaller parts of the Ojibwa people or tribe in North America. The many Native American peoples are distinguished by language and culture, and most have clans and bands as the basic kinship organizations. In some cases tribes recognized each other's clans; for instance, both the Chickasaw and Choctaw tribes of the Southeast United States had fox and bear clans, who felt a kinship that reached beyond their respective tribes.

Apart from these different historical traditions of kinship, conceptual confusion arises from colloquial usages of the term. In post-Soviet countries, for example, it is quite common to speak of "clans" in reference to informal networks within the economic and political sphere. This usage reflects the assumption that their members act towards each other in a particularly close and mutually supportive way, approximating the solidarity among kinsmen. Similar usage of the term applies to specific groups of various cultures and nationalities involved in organized crime. Polish clans differ from most others as they are a collection of families who bear the same coat of arms, as opposed to claiming a common descent (see Polish heraldry). There are multiple closely related clans in the Indian subcontinent, especially South India.

Romani people have many clans which are called vitsa in Romani.

Clannism
Clannism (in Somali culture, qabiilism) is a system of society based on clan affiliation.

The Islamic world, the Near East, North and East Africa in general, and Somali culture specifically, is patriarchal  and traditionally centered on  patrilineal clans or tribes.

Clans by continent or region

See also 
 Clan (video gaming)
 Endogamy
 Extended family
 Uradel
 Gotra

References